Cheshire Public Schools is the school district of Cheshire, Connecticut.

Schools
Secondary:
 Cheshire High School
 Dodd Middle School

Primary:
 Chapman School
 Doolittle School
 Highland School
 Norton School

Preschool through Kindergarten:
 James H. Darcey School and the Stephen August Early Intervention Center (EIC) Preschool

Alternative:
 Humiston School (alternative high school)

References

External links
 Cheshire Public Schools

School districts in Connecticut
Education in New Haven County, Connecticut
Cheshire, Connecticut